Kyung-mo is a Korean masculine given name. The meaning differs based on the hanja with which the name is written. There are 54 hanja with the reading "kyung" and 27 hanja with the reading "mo" on the South Korean government's official list of hanja which may be used in given names.

People with this name include:
Kim Kyung-mo (김경모, born 1989), South Korean baseball player
Kim Kyung-mo (김경모, born 1988), South Korean Starcraft player
Park Kyung-Mo (born 1975), South Korean archer
Sung Kyung-Mo (born 1980), South Korean football player

See also
List of Korean given names

References

Korean masculine given names